1982–83 was the seventieth occasion on which the Lancashire Cup completion had been held.
 
Warrington won the trophy  by beating St. Helens by the score of 16-0
The match was played at Central Park, Wigan, (historically in the county of Lancashire). The attendance was 6,462 and receipts were £11,732.00

Background 

This season saw no new clubs and no withdrawals, leaving the total number of entrants at the 16 level.
With this full sixteen members there was no need for “blank” or “dummy” fixtures or any byes.

Competition and results

Round 1 
Involved  8 matches (with no byes) and 16 clubs

Round 2 - Quarter-finals 
Involved 4 matches and 8 clubs

Round 3 – Semi-finals  
Involved 2 matches and 4 clubs

Round 3 – Semi-finals – replays  
Involved 1 matches and 2 clubs

Final

Teams and scorers 

Scoring - Try = three points - Goal = two points - Drop goal = one point

The road to success

Notes and comments 
1 * Central Park was the home ground of Wigan with a final capacity of 18,000, although the record attendance was  47,747 for Wigan v St Helens 27 March 1959

See also 
1982–83 Rugby Football League season
Rugby league county cups

References

External links
Saints Heritage Society
1896–97 Northern Rugby Football Union season at wigan.rlfans.com 
Hull&Proud Fixtures & Results 1896/1897
Widnes Vikings - One team, one passion Season In Review - 1896-97
The Northern Union at warringtonwolves.org

1982 in English rugby league
RFL Lancashire Cup